Cesvaine ) is a town in Madona Municipality, Vidzeme Region, Latvia. It is home to the Cesvaine Palace, built in 1896 near the ruins of previous medieval castles.

History
During the period before the Livonian Crusade in the 13th century, the territory of modern Cesvaine was part of the Principality of Jersika and was inhabited by ancient Latgalians. It was first mentioned in written sources in 1209 (Latin: Urbs Zcessowe) in the treaty between bishop Albert of Riga and Visvaldis of Jersika.
In 1211 the Bishopric of Riga and the Livonian Brothers of Sword partitioned the lands of Jersika between themselves. The territory of Cesvaine fell under the control of the Livonian Brothers of the Sword, however in 1213 some of the lands were exchanged and Cesvaine became property of the Bishop of Riga.

In the beginning of the 15th century, a stone castle was built in Cesvaine and the settlement started to grow.
By the end of the 16th century there were already 80 houses in Cesvaine.
During the Livonian War in 1577, defenders of Cesvaine castle refused to surrender. Consequently, the Russian tsar Ivan the Terrible ordered that the castle and whole town be destroyed. After the war in 1582 Cesvaine became part of Duchy of Livonia.

In 1656 during the Second Northern War Russians again seized the castle and destroyed the town.

A new period in the history of Cesvaine started in the year 1815 when the settlement and nearby lands were bought by the baron von Wulf. Cesvaine became centre of the manor and rapid development started in the second half of the 19th century.

In 1932 Cesvaine became a village in the Republic of Latvia. It was granted town rights in 1991. Since 2009, the town has become the official administrative centre of Cesvaine municipality.

Notable people
Jakob Lenz (1751–1792), writer

Twin towns — sister cities

Cesvaine is twinned with:

 Coulaines, France
 Dnipropetrovsk Oblast, Ukraine
 Lagardelle-sur-Lèze, France
 Märjamaa, Estonia
 Volkhov, Russia
 Weyhe, Germany

Gallery

See also
 List of cities in Latvia

References

 
Towns in Latvia
1991 establishments in Latvia
Kreis Wenden
Madona Municipality
Vidzeme